Bobby Wilson (29 November 1934 – 17 September 2003) was  a former Australian rules footballer who played with Fitzroy in the Victorian Football League (VFL).

Notes

External links 
		

1934 births
2003 deaths
Australian rules footballers from Victoria (Australia)
Fitzroy Football Club players
Brunswick Football Club players